Seyyed Khalaf is a village in Ahudasht Rural District, Shavur District, Shush County, Khuzestan Province, Iran. At the 2006 census, its population was 924, in 156 families.

References 

Populated places in Shush County